Ibn Hubayra may refer to:

 Umar ibn Hubayra (fl. 710s–720s), Umayyad general and governor of Iraq
 Yazid ibn Umar ibn Hubayra (died 750), Umayyad general and governor of Iraq, son of the above
 Awn ad-Din ibn Hubayra (1105–1165), Arab scholar and vizier